Max Garland is the author of The Postal Confessions, winner of the Juniper Prize for Poetry 1995; Hunger Wide as Heaven, winner of CSU Poetry Center Open Competition 2006; and The Word We Used for It, winner of the Brittingham Poetry Prize 2017. He was inducted as a Fellow of the Wisconsin Academy of Sciences, Arts and Letters in 2018. His poems, essays, and stories have appeared in Poetry, New England Review, Gettysburg Review, Georgia Review, Best American Short Stories, Creative Non-Fiction, and many other journals and anthologies.
Awards include an NEA Fellowship for Poetry, a James Michener Writing Fellowship, a Bush Foundation Literary Fellowship, the Tara Short Fiction Award, and a Wisconsin Institute for Creative Writing Fellowship, as well as fellowships from the Wisconsin Arts Board in both poetry and fiction. He is also a musician and songwriter, and has written librettos for choral and orchestra.
Garland received his undergraduate degree from Western Kentucky University before returning to his home town of Paducah, Kentucky, where he worked for many years as a rural mail carrier on the route where he was born, the route his grandfather ran before him, and the route on which he, as well his parents, grandparents and other relatives lived.
He resigned from the Postal Service in 1986 to attend the Iowa Writer's Workshop where he received an MFA in 1989.
He is currently Professor Emeritus of English and Creative Writing at University of Wisconsin--Eau Claire, the former Writer-in-Residence for the City of Eau Claire, and served as the Poet Laureate of Wisconsin in 2013 and 2014.

References

https://www.wisconsinacademy.org/contributor/max-garland

Living people
People from Eau Claire, Wisconsin
American male poets
Poets from Wisconsin
Poets Laureate of Wisconsin
University of Wisconsin–Eau Claire faculty
National Endowment for the Arts Fellows
Year of birth missing (living people)